Robert Scott Lazar (born January 26, 1959) is an American conspiracy theorist and self-proclaimed physicist who claims he was hired in the late 1980s to reverse-engineer extraterrestrial technology. This work supposedly occurred at a secret site called "S-4", a subsidiary installation allegedly located several kilometers south of the United States Air Force facility popularly known as Area 51.

Lazar purports to have examined an alien craft and read US government briefing documents that described alien involvement in human affairs over the past 10,000 years. His claims brought additional public attention to Area 51 and fueled conspiracy theories surrounding its classified activities. His assertions have been analyzed and rejected by skeptics and some ufologists, although he retains a following of supporters.

Lazar has no evidence of alien life or technology, and elements of his claimed education and employment history have been exaggerated or fabricated. Perceptions of Lazar have also been affected by criminal activity: he was convicted in 1990 for his involvement in a prostitution ring, and again in 2006 for selling illegal chemicals. Journalist Ken Layne states, "A lot of credible people have looked at Lazar's story and rationally concluded that he made it up."

Background

Lazar graduated from high school late, in the bottom third of his class. The only science course he took was a chemistry class. He subsequently attended Pierce Junior College in Los Angeles.

In 1982, Lazar worked as a technician for a contractor company that provided support staff to the Los Alamos Meson Physics Facility, within the Los Alamos National Laboratory. He filed for bankruptcy in 1986, where he described himself as a self-employed film processor. Lazar owns and operates United Nuclear Scientific Equipment and Supplies, which sells a variety of materials and chemicals.

Claims

Education
Lazar claims to have obtained master's degrees in physics from the Massachusetts Institute of Technology (MIT) and in electronics from the California Institute of Technology (Caltech). However, both universities show no record of him. Scientists Stanton T. Friedman and Donald R. Prothero have stated that nobody with Lazar's high school performance record would be accepted by either institution. Lazar is unable to supply the names of any lecturers or fellow students from his alleged tenures at MIT and Caltech; one supposed Caltech professor, William Duxler, was in fact located at Pierce Junior College and had never taught at Caltech. Friedman asserted, "Quite obviously, if one can go to MIT, one doesn't go to Pierce. Lazar was at Pierce at the very same time he was supposedly at MIT more than 2,500 miles away."

Employment
Lazar claims to be a physicist, and to have worked in this capacity during his tenure at the Los Alamos Meson Physics Facility. This assertion was echoed by a local journalist who interviewed Lazar about his interest in jet-powered cars in 1982; some media outlets have since dubbed him a "physicist". Inquiry into Lazar's position at the facility, however, revealed his role to have been a technician for a contractor firm, and that he worked neither as a physicist or for Los Alamos. As such, the laboratory has no records on Lazar, whom Prothero states was "in short, rather a minor player." The Smithsonian, and various mainstream news outlets, have stated that his "physicist" designation is self-proclaimed.

Since 1989, Lazar has achieved public notoriety as an Area 51 conspiracy theorist. In May of that year, he appeared in an interview with investigative reporter George Knapp on Las Vegas TV station KLAS, under the pseudonym "Dennis" and with his face hidden, to discuss his purported employment at "S-4", a subsidiary facility he claimed exists near the Nellis Air Force Base installation known as Area 51. He claims that the said facility was adjacent to Papoose Lake, which is located south of the main Area 51 facility at Groom Lake. He claimed the site consisted of concealed aircraft hangars built into a mountainside. Lazar said that his job was to help with the reverse engineering of one of nine flying saucers, which he alleged were extraterrestrial in origin. He claims one of the flying saucers, the one he coined the "Sport Model", was manufactured out of a metallic substance similar in appearance and touch to liquid titanium. In a subsequent interview that November, Lazar appeared unmasked and under his own name, where he claimed that his job interview for work at the facility was contractor EG&G and his employer was the United States Navy. EG&G stated it had no records on him. His supposed employment at a Nellis Air Force Base subsidiary has also been discredited by skeptics, as well as by the United States Air Force.

Lazar has claimed that the propulsion of the studied vehicle ran on an antimatter reactor and was fueled by the chemical element with atomic number 115 (E115), which at the time was provisionally named ununpentium and had not yet been artificially created. (It was first synthesized in 2003 and later named moscovium.) He said that the propulsion system relied on a stable isotope of E115, which allegedly generates a gravity wave that allowed the vehicle to fly and to evade visual detection by bending light around it. 

No stable isotopes of moscovium have yet been synthesized. All have proven extremely radioactive, decaying in a few hundred milliseconds. Lazar said the craft was dismantled, and the reactor he studied was topped by a sphere or semi-sphere which emitted a force field capable of repulsing human flesh. He explained that the craft was split into two main levels. 

The reactor was positioned at the center of the upper level, with an antenna extending to the top, surrounded by three "gravity amplifiers". These connected to "gravity emitters" on the lower level, which can rotate 180 degrees to output a "gravity beam or anti-gravity wave" and that the craft would then travel "belly first" into this distortion field.

Lazar has claimed that during his joining the program, he read briefing documents describing the historical involvement of Earth for the past 10,000 years with extraterrestrial beings described as grey aliens from a planet orbiting the twin binary star system Zeta Reticuli. As of September 2019, no extrasolar planets have been found in the Zeta Reticuli system. In 1989, Lazar said the seats of the saucer he saw were approximately child-sized and that he had seen alien cadavers of a corresponding size. 

He said that while walking down a hallway at S-4, he briefly glanced through a door window and saw what he interpreted as two men in lab coats facing down and talking to "something small with long arms". Three decades later, he said he did not think he saw an alien, but speculated that he saw a doll used as reference for the size of the alleged aliens, and that a nickname used for them was "the kids".

Lazar alleges that his employment and education records have been erased; however, skeptics Donald R. Prothero, Stanton T. Friedman and Timothy D. Callahan find this to be implausible. His story has drawn significant media attention, controversy, supporters, and detractors. Lazar has no evidence of alien life or technology.

In 2017, Lazar's workplace was raided by the FBI and local police which Lazar theorizes was to recover "element 115", a substance he says he took from a government lab. Records obtained through a freedom of information request show the raid was part of a murder investigation to determine whether his company sold thallium to a murder suspect in Michigan. Lazar is not listed as a suspect in the investigation.

Public appearances and media
Lazar and long-time friend Gene Huff ran the Desert Blast festival, an annual festival in the Nevada desert for pyrotechnics enthusiasts. The festival started in 1987, but was only formally named in 1991. The name was inspired by Operation Desert Storm. The festival features homemade explosives, rockets, jet-powered vehicles, and other pyrotechnics, with the aim of emphasizing the fun aspect of chemistry and physics.

Lazar was featured in producer George Knapp and Jeremy Kenyon Lockyer Corbell's documentary Bob Lazar: Area 51 & Flying Saucers and Joe Rogan's podcast. Lazar had met and discussed his alleged works on UFOs with Navy pilot and commander David Fravor, who witnessed the USS Nimitz UFO incident in 2004.

Criminal convictions
In 1990, Lazar was arrested for aiding and abetting a prostitution ring. This was reduced to felony pandering, to which he pleaded guilty. He was ordered to do 150 hours of community service, stay away from brothels, and undergo psychotherapy.

In 2006, Lazar and his wife Joy White were charged with violating the Federal Hazardous Substances Act for shipping restricted chemicals across state lines. The charges stemmed from a 2003 raid on United Nuclear's business offices, where chemical sales records were examined. United Nuclear pleaded guilty to three criminal counts of introducing into interstate commerce, and aiding and abetting the introduction into interstate commerce, banned hazardous substances. In 2007, United Nuclear was fined $7,500 for violating a law prohibiting the sale of chemicals and components used to make illegal fireworks.

Journalist Stephen Rodrick and author Neil Nixon write that further doubts have been cast on Lazar's credibility due to his criminal activity. Author Timothy Good and filmmaker Jeremy Kenyon Lockyer Corbell, who have perpetuated Lazar's story, concur with this assertion.

Footnotes

References

Sources

External links

1959 births
Living people
UFO conspiracy theorists
People from Coral Gables, Florida
Los Angeles Pierce College alumni
American conspiracy theorists
20th-century American businesspeople
Businesspeople from Florida